William Murdoch (24 February 1823 – 4 May 1887) was a Scottish-Canadian poet.

Born in Paisley, Renfrewshire, Scotland, Murdoch migrated to Canada in 1854, aged 31. The following year, he was appointed manager of the gasworks on Partridge Island in Saint John, New Brunswick. He contributed to the Saint John Morning News from 1865, and published Poems and Songs (1860) and Discursory Ruminations: A Fireside Drama (1876).

Murdoch died in Saint John, New Brunswick, Canada.

Style
He wrote in the Lowland Scots dialogue made popular by Robert Burns. The Literary History of Canada describes Murdoch's poems as having "style and polish" and it cites the following stanza as representative:

God pity then the poor blue noses Their cheeks like flour, their nebs like roses;  They puff, they grue, and swallow dosesTo heat their wameTill aft when night their business closes
They hiccup hame.
 – from Poems and Songs

References

External links 
 Poems and songs – William Murdoch

1823 births
1887 deaths
19th-century Canadian poets
Canadian male poets
English-language poets
Writers from Saint John, New Brunswick
Scottish emigrants to pre-Confederation New Brunswick
Scottish poets
Poets from Paisley, Renfrewshire
Journalists from Paisley, Renfrewshire
Journalists from New Brunswick
19th-century British journalists
British male journalists
19th-century British male writers
Canadian male non-fiction writers